The 2020 World Series of Poker Online was a series of online poker tournaments organized by the World Series of Poker (WSOP). It was held from July 1-September 8 and featured 85 bracelet events, 31 on WSOP.com and 54 on GGPoker.

In June, the WSOP announced the series as a result of postponing the 2020 WSOP in Las Vegas, Nevada due to the COVID-19 pandemic. Events included the $50 Big 50, the lowest buy-in WSOP event in history, as well as four People's Choice tournaments that allowed players to vote on which game to play. The series culminated in the $5,000 No Limit Hold'em Main Event beginning on August 16 with a $25 million guaranteed prize pool, the largest in online poker history.

Poker Central and GGPoker.TV streamed 12 final tables during the series. Tournaments on WSOP.com were open only to players located in Nevada or New Jersey, while GGPoker events were open to international players.

The first two events on GGPoker were expected to conclude on July 19. After a bug was discovered on the site's servers, however, the tournaments were postponed by a week.

WSOP.com Schedule

Source: 

Key: (bracelet number for 2020/bracelet number for career)

WSOP.com Leaderboard

GGPoker Schedule

Source: 

Key: (bracelet number for 2020/bracelet number for career)

Main Event
The $5,000 No Limit Hold'em Main Event began on August 16 and featured 23 starting flights. Players were allowed to re-enter a maximum of three times. The surviving players from each flight combined for Day 2 on August 30, with the final table being played on September 5.

The Main Event attracted 5,802 players, creating a prize pool of $27,559,500, the largest in online poker history. The winner earned $3,904,686.

*Career statistics prior to the Main Event

GGPoker Leaderboard

References

External links
Official site
GGPoker

World Series of Poker
World Series of Poker